FEPC may refer to:
 Fair Employment Practice Committee
 Federation of Electric Power Companies, a Japanese organization